Narrow-gauge railways were often used by the slate industry because of their low cost and ease of operation.

References

Bibliography 
 
 

 
Industrial railways in England
Narrow gauge
Mining in England